Cyrtopogon lutatius is a species of robber fly in the family Asilidae.

References

Further reading

External links
Diptera.info

Asilidae